Mehrotra is a Khatri surname. It is an extended version of Mehra, derived from Mihir, which means sun, or it may mean chief or master.Malhotra is a modified form of Mehrotra.

They are from the topmost hierarchal section, The Dhai Ghar (i.e House of 2.5)

Notable people
Arvind Krishna Mehrotra (born 1947), Indian poet
Ashley Mehrotra (born 1969), New Zealand cricket umpire
Jaideep Mehrotra (born 1954), Indian artist
Manish Mehrotra (born 1974), Indian chef
Rahul Mehrotra, Indian architect and urban planner
Rajiv Mehrotra, Indian writer and documentary filmmaker 
Ram Charan Mehrotra (1922–2004), Indian chemist and academic
Sanjay Mehrotra, Indian-born American businessman
Santosh Mehrotra (born 1955), Indian economist
S. R. Mehrotra (1931–2019), Indian historian
Tulika Mehrotra, American writer and journalist
Vishal Mehrotra (1972–1981), murdered British Indian child

References

Indian surnames
Surnames of Indian origin
Punjabi-language surnames
Hindu surnames
Khatri clans
Khatri surnames